Gornji Detlak is a village in the municipality of Derventa, Bosnia and Herzegovina. A notable person from this village is a musician Saša Savković.

References

Villages in Republika Srpska
Populated places in Derventa